Superdry plc (stylised as SUPERDRY®︎冒険魂) is a UK branded clothing company, and owner of the Superdry label. Superdry products combine vintage American styling with Japanese-inspired graphics. It is listed on the London Stock Exchange.

History

Cult Clothing Co was established by Ian Hibbs and Julian Dunkerton in Cheltenham in 1985. During this period, Dunkerton met James Holder, who at the time was running skatewear brand Bench. In 2003, they joined forces to found Superdry, opening its first store in Covent Garden in London in 2004.

Under Theo Karpathios, a nationwide then global expansion of Superdry took place. The business floated on the London Stock Exchange in March 2010. The company issued a profits warning and placed its store opening plans under review in February 2012; the share price quickly dropped by 18%.

On 22 October 2014, it was announced that Dunkerton had stepped down as CEO of Superdry and been replaced by Euan Sutherland, the ex-CEO of The Co-operative Group. In February 2016 Dunkerton sold four million shares at £12 per share (for a total of £48 million), but remained the largest shareholder with a 27% stake in the group.

On 8 January 2018 SuperGroup plc changed its name to Superdry plc.

On 2 April 2019, after founder Dunkerton won his bid to be reinstated to the board of the company, the company's chairman Peter Bamford, chief executive Euan Sutherland, chief financial officer Ed Barker, and remuneration committee chair Penny Hughes resigned from the board "and will stand down with immediate effect". Further directors Dennis Millard, Minnow Powell, Sarah Wood and John Smith gave three-months notice of their intention to stand down as directors from 1 July. Only two board members remained: company secretary Simon Callander, and non-executive director John Smith. In October 2019, Julian Dunkerton was appointed as permanent CEO, after his run as Interim CEO since April 2019. His contract for the position was due to run until April 2021. Following his return, Dunkerton aimed to minimise promotions and focus on full-price sales, which led to the chain experiencing a decrease in sales over the 2019 Christmas period. Dunkerton also pulled out of a footwear licensing deal with Pentland, expressing his desire to focus on the jackets and hoodies the brand is known for.

In January 2021 the company announced that despite the fact that there may be significant doubt about the group's ability to continue as a going concern, the directors had a "reasonable expectation" that the company would continue in operational existence for the foreseeable future.

Image
After football player David Beckham wore a Superdry leather jacket in 2007, it resulted in over 70,000 units being sold. Superdry was endorsed by actor Idris Elba in 2015.

The company uses Japanese characters on its products, often of short text snippets such as 'Sunglasses company' or 'membership certificate'. The company explained to a Japanese television news programme that most translations were done using simple automatic translation programs such as Babelfish, without attempting to make the texts accurate.

See also
 Cool Japan

References

External links

 

Clothing brands of the United Kingdom
Clothing companies of England
English brands
Jeans by brand
Underwear brands
Clothing companies established in 2003
Retail companies established in 2004
Companies based in Cheltenham
Companies listed on the London Stock Exchange
2010 initial public offerings